Margaret Magdalen Heinz Karcher (March 2, 1915 – June 6, 2006) was an American fast-food pioneer who co-founded the Carl's Jr. hamburger chain with her husband Carl Karcher, which today is owned by parent company CKE Restaurants.

Karcher and her husband started their first business, a hot dog stand, on July 17, 1941, in Los Angeles, California, when they borrowed $311 against their Plymouth automobile and added $15 from Margaret's purse. The stand initially sold hot dogs and Mexican tamales. On January 16, 1945, they opened their first restaurant, Carl's Drive-In Barbecue in Anaheim, California. They also opened Carl's Jr.

Their restaurant quickly grew and they opened several more restaurants, numbering 100 by 1974 and more than 300 by 1981.

References

External links
 Margaret Karcher, wife of Carl's Jr. founder, dies at 91 (CKE Restaurants press release)

1915 births
2006 deaths
People from Anaheim, California
CKE Restaurants
Fast-food chain founders
Deaths from liver cancer
Deaths from cancer in Arizona
Burials in Orange County, California
American women company founders
20th-century American businesspeople
20th-century American businesswomen
21st-century American women